Guilty as Charged! is the only studio album released by the American heavy metal band Culprit through Shrapnel Records in 1983.

Critical reception

Eduardo Rivadavia of AllMusic gave the album a glowing review, writing "one has to wonder if the then still Dungeons & Dragons-toting Queensrÿche didn't take note of Culprit's more lucid approach further down the road, since Guilty as Charged feels in many ways like a rough draft of Operation: Mindcrime. All conjecture aside, and even more unusual as compared to their average labelmates' guitar-first philosophy, Culprit songs like 'Steel to Blood,' 'Ambush,' and 'Same to You' boasted extremely memorable, singalong choruses to go with their disciplined instrumental foundations. As it stands, Guilty as Charged remains a lost gem of American metal from the 1980s, and well worth seeking out for fans of other bands from the period." Canadian journalist Martin Popoff was less enthusiastic and found the execution "too loose, raw and undisciplined to impress", conceding that the band "showed promise and caused a lot of hype never to be fulfilled".

In 2005, Guilty as Charged! was ranked number 476 in Rock Hard magazine's book The 500 Greatest Rock & Metal Albums of All Time.

Track listing

Personnel
Culprit
Jeff L'Heureux - vocals
John DeVol  - guitar
Kjartan Kristoffersen  - guitar
Scott Earl  - bass
Bud Burrill  - drums, lead vocals on track 11

Production
Mike Varney - producer
Allen Sudduth - engineer
Paul Stubblebine - mastering at The Automatt, San Francisco, California
Candy Folwer - artwork
Rex Rystedt - photography

References

1983 debut albums
Culprit (band) albums
Shrapnel Records albums
Albums produced by Mike Varney